Claus Hant is a German writer, best known as the creator of Der Bulle von Tölz, a TV series that ran on prime time for over a decade and made German TV history with its audience figures. Hant's films have been nominated for the Adolf Grimme Awards and have been honoured with the Goldener Löwe/Deutscher Fernsehpreis, the Cadrage Succes, the Romy (TV award) and the Bavarian Film Awards.

Claus Hant has also written Young Hitler, a book about the formative years of the German dictator Adolf Hitler, published by Quartet Books, London.

Film and television
Eight Miles High (feature film, contributor)
Der Bulle von Tölz (television series, seven episodes)
Der große Kater (feature film starring Bruno Ganz, based on a novel by Thomas Hürlimann)
Der Räuber Hotzenplotz

Thriller
Affenschande, S. Fischer Verlag, Frankfurt am Main 2005 
Weltspartag, S. Fischer Verlag, Frankfurt am Main 2007.

Non-Fiction
Young Hitler, Quartet Books, London 2010
Das Drehbuch. Praktische Filmdramaturgie. Zweitausendeins, Frankfurt am Main 1999
Hitler, Die wenig bekannten Fakten, Bookmundo, Rotterdamm, 2020, ISBN 978-9-40360-415-2

References

External links
 
 Young Hitler website

Living people
German male writers
German television writers
Male television writers
English-language writers from Germany
German thriller writers
German screenwriters
German male screenwriters
Year of birth missing (living people)